Stratford City is a mixed-use development project in Stratford, London, England, to the north of Stratford town centre. The main developers are the Westfield Group and Lendlease.

Stratford City is the name given to the urban community centred on the Queen Elizabeth Olympic Park. Based on Stratford Regional and Stratford International railway stations, it includes "International Quarter London", a joint venture between Lendlease and London and Continental Railways (LCR) to create a £2 billion commercial and residential development, the Westfield shopping centre, Chobham Academy, and the East Village, previously the athletes' village constructed by Lendlease for the London 2012 Olympic and Paralympic Games.

Royal Mail has allocated the postcode E20 to Stratford City and the Queen Elizabeth Olympic Park.

Planning
The whole Queen Elizabeth II Olympic Park site was proposed to be secured under a compulsory purchase order (CPO) by the London Development Agency. In late 2005, a row broke out between then Mayor of London Ken Livingstone and Newham Council/Westfield over the use of the legal instrument. The site for the Olympic Village was to be located next to the £4 billion development of Stratford City, but access difficulties meant that the Olympic Park CPO extended onto the site for Stratford City. In November 2005, an agreement was made where by the CPO over the Westfield site was removed, subject to agreed access provisions to the Olympic Village.

The Olympic Village, home of the athletes during the 2012 Summer Games and constructed by Lend Lease, would be redeveloped at the new East Village urban development as part of the legacy project.

Construction
Work started in early 2007, and the entire project was completed in 2012. Work was carried out in phases, with Phase 1 completed in 2011. Phase 1 includes 1.9 million ft² (150,000 m2) of retail and leisure space (see Westfield Stratford City), a 267-room Premier Inn hotel,  1.1m sq ft of office space, and 4,850 new homes. The office space comprises a cluster of four tall office buildings: Stratford Place, at 130,000 sq ft; The Square, at 200,000 sq ft; First Avenue, at over 560,000 sq ft; and Station Square, at 95,000 sq ft.

Transport
The site is adjacent to both the existing Stratford Regional station and the new Stratford International station.  Stratford Regional station is served by London Overground, Docklands Light Railway, TfL Rail, London Underground and National Rail services, with Crossrail services planned to serve the station from 2018. Stratford International station is served by Southeastern domestic services on High Speed 1 and Docklands Light Railway services to London City Airport, Beckton and Woolwich Arsenal. Currently no international services call at Stratford International. A pedestrian bridge connects the development to the existing Stratford town centre.

References

External links

 
 International Quarter London

Redevelopment projects in London
Thames Gateway
Buildings and structures in the London Borough of Newham
Stratford, London